Netwerk (Network) was a Dutch 'behind the news' television show on Nederland 2, aired between 1996 and 2010. It received in 2005 an International Emmy Award for the continuing news coverage Return to Beslan.

References 

Dutch television news shows
1996 Dutch television series debuts
2010 Dutch television series endings
1990s Dutch television series
2000s Dutch television series
2010s Dutch television series
NPO 1 original programming